Mark Olson may refer to: 

 Mark Olson (musician) (born 1961), American country singer-songwriter
 Mark Douglas Olson (born 1955), American politician
 Mark W. Olson (1943–2018), U.S. Federal Reserve governor
 Mark Olson (curler), Canadian curler (Manitoba team)
 Mark Olson (British Columbia curler), Canadian curler (British Columbia team); see 2016 Canadian Direct Insurance BC Men's Curling Championship

See also
 Mark Olson (disambiguation)